Anathallis subnulla is a species of orchid plant native to Brazil.

References 

subnulla
Flora of Brazil